The Choma Museum and Crafts Centre is a museum in Choma, Zambia dedicated to preserving the heritage of the Tonga tribe.  It houses and sells traditional crafts and artifacts.

References

Museums in Zambia
Buildings and structures in Southern Province, Zambia